The  is a rubber-tyred metro line in Sapporo, Hokkaido, Japan. It is part of the Sapporo Municipal Subway system. Its name literally means South-North Line, and it runs from Asabu Station in Kita-ku to Makomanai Station in Minami-ku. The Namboku Line color on maps is green, and its stations carry the letter "N" followed by a number.

Station list 
 All stations are located in Sapporo.

History 

 December 16, 1971: Kita-Nijūyo-Jō – Makomanai section opens; 1000 series trains introduced.
 March 16, 1978: Kita-Nijūyo-Jō – Asabu section opens; all trains operated as 8-car sets.
 October 1, 1978: 3000 series trains introduced.
 October 14, 1994: Reien-Mae Station renamed Minami-Hiragishi Station.
 September 1995: 5000 series trains introduced.
 June 27, 1999: 1000/2000 series trains withdrawn.
 August 18, 2008: Women-only cars introduced on trial basis (until September 12, 2008).
 December 15, 2008: "Women and Children Comfort Car" introduced.
 January 30, 2009: SAPICA contactless smart card introduced.

Future developments
Platform edge doors are scheduled to be installed on all stations by 2014.

External links

 Sapporo City Transportation Bureau 

Sapporo Municipal Subway
Rail transport in Hokkaido
750 V DC railway electrification
Railway lines opened in 1971
1971 establishments in Japan